The Women's time trial B road cycling event at the 2016 Summer Paralympics took place on the afternoon of 14 September at Flamengo Park, Pontal. 14 riders (with pilots) competed over two laps of a fifteen kilometre course.

The B category is for cyclists with visual impairment. Sighted guides act as pilots in these events, which take place on tandem bikes.

Results
Women's road time trial B. 14 September 2016, Rio.

References

Women's road time trial B